In English legal proceedings, a confidentiality club (also known as confidentiality ring) is an agreement occasionally reached by parties to a litigation to reduce the risk of confidential documents being used outside the litigation. The agreement typically provides that only specified persons can access some documents. Setting up a confidentiality club "requires some degree of cooperation between the parties". Confidentiality rings or clubs were described in 2012 as being increasingly common; the case report on Roche Diagnostics Ltd. v Mid Yorkshire Hospitals NHS Trust, a public procurement dispute, also notes that they are "common in cases of this kind", and allow for specific disclosure of documents without causing the "difficulty relating to confidentiality" which would otherwise arise.

References

Information sensitivity
Law of the United Kingdom